Gosh It's ... Bad Manners is the third album by British 2 Tone and ska band Bad Manners from the year 1981 and their most popular and successful album, peaking at number 18 on the UK album chart. The band had originally formed in 1976 while the members were together at Woodberry Down Comprehensive School, North London. They commemorated the 1981 closure of the school on the back sleeve of the album.

Track listing

 All songs by Bad Manners unless noted.

"Walking in the Sunshine" – 3:29
"Dansetta" – 3:19
"Can Can" – 2:49 (Jacques Offenbach)
"Weeping and Wailing" – 3:42
"Casablanca (Rags and Riches)" – 4:53
"Don't Be Angry" (Live) (Nappy Brown) – 2:33
"Ben E. Wriggle" – 3:50
"Runaway" – 3:11
"Never Will Change" – 3:06
"Only Funkin'" – 3:37
"End of the World" – 3:00
"Gherkin" – 4:40

 2011 Bonus Tracks
 "Armchair Disco" – 3:12
 "Night Bus to Dalston" (Vocal Version) – 2:14
 "Buona Sera" (Carl Sigman, Peter DeRose) – 2:50
 "The New One" – 1:05
 "No Respect" – 1:58
 "Walking in the Sunshine" (Extended Version) – 5:33

Personnel

Buster Bloodvessel – Vocals
Louis 'Alphonso' Cook – Guitar
David Farren – Bass & String Bass
Martin Stewart – Keyboards & Bagpipes
Brian Tuitt – Drums & Percussion
Chris Kane – Saxophone & Tin Whistle
Andrew Marson – Saxophone
Paul "Gus" Hyman – Trumpet
Winston Bazoomies – Harmonica
Roger Lomas – Production
Ted Sharp – Engineer
Recorded & Mixed at Rockfield Studios, Monmouth, Wales

Bad Manners albums
1981 albums
Magnet Records albums
Albums recorded at Rockfield Studios